The Mil Mi-38 is a transport helicopter designed by Mil Moscow Helicopter Plant and being developed by Kazan Helicopters. Originally intended as a replacement for the Mil Mi-8 and the Mi-17, it is being marketed in both military and civil versions. It flew for the first time on 22 December 2003 and was certified on 30 December 2015.

History
The Mi-38's development was carried out by Kazan Helicopters since early 1980s and a mockup was first shown during the 1989 Paris Air Show. After the dissolution of the Soviet Union in 1991, Kazan Helicopters went into collaboration with Eurocopter that was to adapt the Mi-38 for international market. In September 1994, Euromil JSC was established and funding of the programme began a month later. Sextant and Pratt & Whitney Canada were also to participate in the programme as suppliers of Mi-38's avionics and powerplant equipment. Initially, the helicopter was to be first flight tested in 1999, but only on 18 August 1999 a contract was signed for completion of the first demonstrator. In 2001, testing of Mi-38's rotor blades was carried out on a Mi-17 helicopter. The first Mi-38 demonstrator (PT-1) performed its maiden flight above the Kazan Helicopters plant on 22 December 2003.

The second prototype (OP-2), powered by Pratt & Whitney Canada PW127/TS engines, made its first flight on 2 December 2010. The prototype is also equipped with the IBKO-38 or IBKV-38 aviation complex, developed by Transas Aviation, which implements a concept of a glass cockpit for the Mi-38. The same month, OP-2 performed its first long-haul flight from Kazan to Moscow, which covers more than 800 km.

In March 2013, the Fédération Aéronautique Internationale has confirmed the Mi-38 prototypes have already set five records in the E1h class. The second prototype aircraft set an altitude record by reaching 8,620 meters (28,280 feet) without a payload. The second and third records were for climbing speed; the Mi-38 reached a height of 3,000 meters (9,843 feet) in six minutes, then followed this to reach 6,000 meters (19,685 feet) in 10 minutes and 52 seconds. Two further records were altitude records: the first was set at 7,895 meters (25,902 feet) with a 1,000-kg (2,205-lb) payload, the second at 7,020 meters (23,031 feet) with a 2,000-kg (4,409-lb) payload.

The third prototype (OP-3), began its flight tests on 17 December 2013.

The fourth and final prototype (OP-4), first took off on 16 October 2014. Same as the OP-3, it is powered by Klimov TV7-117V engines but differs from the third prototype by its impact-resistant fuel system and enlarged portholes.

On 30 December 2015, Rosaviatsiya certified the Mi-38, completing the testing and certification program and allowing for the delivery of the first production model.  Certification was based on the third and fourth flight-test prototypes with  Klimov TV7-117V engines.

In July 2017, a contract for delivery of first two serial Mi-38s to the Russian Defence Ministry was signed. The Kazan Helicopters plant launched the serial production of the helicopter on 10 January 2018. In total, the Russian Defence Ministry planned to purchase about 15 helicopters until 2020.

On 23 November 2018, military variant, Mi-38T, performed its maiden flight. The new variant was developed to meet the Russian MoD's new requirements for the helicopter and due to international sanctions imposed on Russia, all of its components, including engines and avionics, are Russian-made. Deputy Managing Director at Kazan Helicopters Vadim Ligai stated that the Mi-38 can now carry up to 40 passengers. The Russian Defence Ministry took delivery of the first two serial Mi-38s in December 2019. In January 2020, Russian Helicopters announced that it had received orders from an unspecified export customer (reported by Russian media sources to  be in the Middle East) for Mi-38Ts in "transport and increased comfort cabin configurations", with delivery from 2021 to 2022. The RF Defense Ministry ordered 2 more Mi-38s in increased comfort cabin configuration in August 2020 and the Ministry of Emergency Situations ordered 9 in August 2021.

Variants
Mi-38-1 Western version of the Mi-38, powered by Pratt & Whitney PW127TS engines. Flew to an altitude above  in flight testing.
Mi-38-2 Russian version of the Mi-38, powered by Klimov TV7-117V engines.
Mi-38T Russian military version of the Mi-38.

Operators

Specifications (Mi-38)

See also

References

External links

 
 Type certificate for the Mi-38-2, Federal Air Transport Agency (Rosaviatsia), 30 December 2015

2000s Russian military transport aircraft
2000s Russian cargo aircraft
Mil aircraft
2000s Russian helicopters
Twin-turbine helicopters
Aircraft first flown in 2003
Military transport helicopters